Low Mass (Latin Missa lecta,  "read Mass") is a Tridentine Mass defined officially in the Code of Rubrics included in the 1962 edition of the Roman Missal as a Mass in which the priest does not chant the parts that the rubrics assign to him. A sung Mass celebrated with the assistance of sacred ministers (deacon and subdeacon) is a High or Solemn Mass; without them it is a Missa Cantata.

History
Low Mass originated in the early Middle Ages as a shortened or simplified form of Solemn Mass. In the early church, as in the Orthodox church today, all services were chanted, and there was no equivalent to the Roman Low Mass or to the Anglican "said celebration".

Masses without solemnity in early Christianity
Alongside the public solemn Masses, the practice developed from the 4th century onwards, of smaller private Masses for smaller groups of believers. These masses were often celebrated in the catacombs, for the deceased or on a special anniversary. An example is provided by Saint Augustine:

Medieval origins of the Low Mass
Christian practice had been that there was, at most, one Mass in a monastery or parish church each day. At Cluny in the 11th century a lay-brother (conversus) was summoned to serve any priest-monk who wanted to celebrate; rules and obligations, as the reading of a Sequence, during the celebration of the private Masses gradually fell, for reasons of convenience. This history of liturgy shows how "out of the private Mass grew the read Mass – the low Mass".

In the late Middle Ages, with a growing awareness of the infinite value of the Mass, came a growing desire to multiply its celebration. Spiritual, as well as material reasons were at hand. The most pronounced result of the multiplying of Masses was the increase in low Masses, since most of them were for private requests and had no public character. This trend to the private and the subjective, to an independence from the grand order of things was also displayed in another abuse, namely, setting aside the arrangement of the ecclesiastical year and confining oneself to Votive Masses either chosen at will or arranged according to the rules of the Mass series. Over time it became necessary for a variety of reasons to celebrate more than one on the same day. It also became customary for monasteries to ordain most of their monks, though originally monks were almost all laymen, and for every priest to say a daily Mass. For a while, concelebration, whereby several priests took a full priestly part in offering Mass, provided all with the possibility to celebrate Mass each day, but this custom died out. Low Mass is considered to be a necessity that falls short of the ideal, which is Solemn Mass.

The Catholic Encyclopedia of 1913 describes the result as follows:

By the end of the Middle Ages, critics had grown more numerous, and mystics, such as Nicholas of Cusa, or bishops, attempted a spiritual and disciplinary reform, to avoid scandals of botched Masses and abuse of stipends. A special work of Martin Luther's deals with "the abomination of the low Mass called the canon" (Von dem Greuel der Stillmesse so man Canon nennet, 1524). His criticisms were such that priests, who had been living on Mass stipends, could no longer do so as easily, even in staunchly Catholic areas as the Archbishopric of Salzburg.

Tridentine Reform
The Council of Trent was concerned above all with the "Low Mass" (that is, with a liturgy that was recited and not sung), which had become the ordinary form of the Eucharistic celebration in the parishes. In 1562, a special commission was to assemble the abusus missae. The Roman Missal revised after the Council of Trent appears as a work that defines, above all, the rituals of "Low Mass" or the "private Mass". Some have argued that in giving priority to the "Low Mass", a practice developed of making the Eucharistic celebration an act of private devotion by the priest, whereas the faithful were simply invited to attend the Mass and to unite their prayers with it as sincerely as possible as a certain individualism developed alongside the devotio moderna.

Those who during the Counter-Reformation attempted to rebuild religious life had to look for different ways and means to enable the faithful to participate in a devout manner. One of the ways was to encourage vocal prayer during Mass, to meditate on the mysteries of the life of Christ by praying the Rosary, a practise which had existed locally since the Middle Ages, but which become popular under the influence of the popular missions organized by the Jesuits. The German Singmesse, which added sung hymns to the Low Mass, gradually won great popularity, to the place that it began to take over the Solemn Mass.

By the mid-20th century, a new form of the Low Mass, the missa dialogata, appeared as a new mode of encouraging the participation of the faithful. In the Low Mass, the alternation of functions between priest, lector, singing choir and people had been leveled off to a uniform speaking by the priest alone. However, the Low Mass had acquired such a great preponderance over the various forms of high Mass that without further ado it was used as the groundwork for the development of the dialogue Mass. In essentials nevertheless, the High Mass had to set the norm. Various local churches went in various directions and the so-called Betsingmesse ("pray and sing mass") very quickly gained recognition since its first trial use at the Vienna Catholic Day in 1933. No changes affected the Missale Romanum, neither its texts nor its rubrics, as the changes concerned the participation of the faithful solely.

Stratford Caldecott has lamented that the influence of Low Mass has extended even into the post-Vatican II Mass and that, despite protestations to the contrary, the Low Mass may in his view be said to be its real model.

In 2007 Pope Benedict XVI introduced an optional novelty into the traditional Low Mass: in Masses with a congregation celebrated according to the 1962 Missal, the vernacular language, and not Latin alone, may be used in proclaiming the Scripture readings, provided that the translation used comes from an edition approved by the Holy See.

"Private Mass" 

"Private Mass" (in Latin, Missa privata or secreta, familiaris, peculiaris), which is now understood as Mass celebrated without a congregation (sine populo), formerly meant any Low Mass, even with a large congregation. In 1960 Pope John XXIII, who in 1962 removed from the Roman Missal the section headed Rubricae generales Missalis, replacing it with his Code of Rubrics, decried use of the term "Missa privata": "The most sacred Sacrifice of the Mass celebrated according to the rites and regulations is an act of public worship offered to God in the name of Christ and the Church. Therefore, the term 'private Mass' should be avoided." When applied to Low Mass in general, the word privata indicated that that form of Mass was deprived of certain ceremonies.

Structure of the Low Mass

The Eucharistic celebration is "one single act of worship" but consists of different elements, which always include "the proclamation of the Word of God; thanksgiving to God the Father for all his benefits, above all the gift of his Son; the consecration of bread and wine, which signifies also our own transformation into the body of Christ; and participation in the liturgical banquet by receiving the Lord's body and blood".

Low Mass, celebrated in exactly the same way whether a congregation is present or not, was the most common form of Mass before 1969. In the 1970 edition of the Roman Missal a distinction was made between Mass celebrated with a congregation and Mass celebrated without a congregation. No such distinction was made in earlier (Tridentine) editions of the Roman Missal, which only distinguished between Solemn Mass and Low Mass (calling the latter Missa lecta or, as in the Rubricae generales Missalis included in pre-1962 editions, Missa privata).

The structure of the Low Mass is generally the same as that of the Solemn High Mass. However, prayers after Mass, including the Leonine prayers, are added. The main celebrant is not assisted by a deacon nor subdeacon, nor is he answered by a choir, but one or two altar servers follow their duties as acolytes, and answer the responses in Latin. All prayers are recited and no singing is expected. The incensement rite is not included. The faithful are expected to kneel for most of the Mass, except for the proclamation of the Gospel.

Variations

National variations
Originally, Low Mass was sung in monotone.  Thus we read of priests in the Middle Ages going to sing their "Missa privata" or "Low Mass". This custom of singing died out in the 18th century. Much of Low Mass is said in a voice audible only to the celebrating priest and the server(s).

The French and Germans evolved the concept of accompanying Low Mass with music as an aid to the devotion of the faithful, thus giving rise to the French Organ Mass and the Deutsche Singmesse. Also Messe basse, the French translation of Low Mass, was used to indicate Mass compositions, e.g. Fauré's Messe basse.

In 1922, the Holy See granted approval to the Dialogue Mass, which enabled the faithful to speak, with the server, the Latin responses of the Tridentine Mass and to recite the parts that they were permitted to sing at a Missa Cantata, as well as the triple "Domine non sum dignus" that the priest said as part of the rite of Communion of the faithful, which, though not envisaged in the Ordinary of the Mass until after the Second Vatican Council, could be inserted into the celebration of Mass.

The three Masses of All Souls Day
All Souls Day is the only non-Sunday, non-Holy Day in the Church Year on which a priest is permitted to celebrate three Masses. The Tridentine Missal contains three distinct sets of Mass Propers to be celebrated, should a priest be able to celebrate all three Masses. Note that no matter how many Masses are celebrated, the faithful may receive Holy Communion at no more than two Masses per day.

Pontifical Low Mass
At a Pontifical Low Mass, i.e. a Low Mass celebrated by a bishop, in addition to the two servers that you find at any typical low Mass, there are also two priest-attendants to the bishop that assist him, reminding us that a bishop retains the fullness of holy orders. Instead of a mitre, a biretta is used by the prelate.

Before the Second Vatican Council, at a Papal Low Mass (which was usually celebrated at a portable altar set up in one of the rooms of the Apostolic Palace and is distinct from the private Mass the Pope said in his private chapel), the Pope was assisted by two bishops and four papal Masters of Ceremonies. Chamberlains (cubicularii) served as torchbearers. The pontifical canon was used, as was the bugia. Vesting and unvesting at the altar is another peculiarity of Pontifical Low Mass.

In popular culture
The Three Low Masses (Les Trois Messes basses) is a Christmas story by Alphonse Daudet, published in 1875 in the Tales of Monday and integrated in 1879 in the collection of the Letters from my Windmill. The story is at the end of the eighteenth century, in an imaginary Provençal castle. Pleasant and irreverent, tinged with fantasy, it depicts a priest guilty of the sin of gluttony. Tempted by the devil who, in the guise of his young sexton, has described to him in great detail the exquisite menu of New Year's Eve, he sends off three Christmas Masses to rush more quickly to the table. God punishes his offense: before going to heaven, he will have to recite, for a century, in the company of his faithful culprits, a service of the Nativity, or three hundred low masses.

A French-language film with the same title was made in 1954 by Marcel Pagnol.

However, the Christmas Low Masses are a goof as the rubrics extended the privilege of three sung Masses from the Pope to all the clergy, and in no case applied to the Low Mass. The three stational Masses celebrated by the Pope in Rome extended to three Christmas Masses to be sung, not without interruption: that of the day, solemnissima,; that of the night, valde solemnis,; that of daybreak, minus solemnis and resulted of a duplicate of the feast of the Epiphanies in Jerusalem. The privilege of celebrating at night did not extend, except indult, to private Masses, i.e. low Masses; the contrary custom was an abuse and was condoned.

References

External links
Preparations for a Low Mass - Handbook for Sacristan by Rev. William O'Brien, 1932
A Manual of the Ceremonies of Low Mass - Compiled and arranged by The Rev. L Kuenzel, 1923
Learning the Low Mass: A Manual for Seminarians and Priests by Rev. Walter J. Schmitz, S.S., S.T.D.

Media
Video tutorial of Low Mass with over 500 photos and accompanying liturgical texts
Video of a Low Mass offered by an FSSP priest in North America on the Feast of the Transfiguration
Video of the same Low Mass as above, but with a voice-over meditation taken from the writings of St. Peter Julian Eymard (alternate host)
Another video of a Low Mass

Catholic liturgy
Christian terminology
Tridentine Mass
Anglican Eucharistic theology